Salvia serpyllifolia is a woody perennial endemic to a small area in the Mexican state of San Luis Potosi. It was described by Merritt Lyndon Fernald in 1900, who gave it the epithet serpyllifolia because of its small, shiny leaves—similar to the leaves of Thymus serpyllum. Salvia serpyllifolia was introduced into horticulture in 1990 from seed collected at 7,000 feet elevation. At that time it was thought to be a variety of Salvia microphylla.

The  leaves are a bright glossy green which give off a faint straw-like aroma when crushed. The whorls consist of 2–6 flowers each.

Notes

serpyllifolia
Endemic flora of Mexico
Garden plants of North America
Drought-tolerant plants
Plants described in 1900